1980 Dakar Rally also known as the 1980 Paris–Dakar Rally was the 2nd running of the Dakar Rally event, starting from Paris on 1 January and finishing in Dakar on the 23 January. The 1980 event saw vehicle manufacturers such as Yamaha, Volkswagen, Lada, and BMW taking part and the introduction of a truck category.

Summary
216 competitors started the rally of which 81 made the finish. Cyril Neveu won for the second time in succession on a Yamaha, Freddy Kottulinsky won the car class driving a Volkswagen and Zohra Ataouat became the first winner of the truck class driving for Sonacome.

Stages

Leading Results

Bikes

Cars

Of the 216 starters, 81 completed the event - 49 cars (of 116), 25 bikes (of 90) and 7 trucks (of 10).

References

Dakar Rally
D
1980 in African sport
1980 in French motorsport